Roger Kortko (born February 1, 1963) is a former professional ice hockey player who played 79 games in the National Hockey League.  He played with the New York Islanders.

Career statistics

References 

1963 births
Canadian ice hockey centres
New York Islanders draft picks
New York Islanders players
Living people
People from Rosthern, Saskatchewan
Ice hockey people from Saskatchewan
Saskatoon Blades players
Springfield Indians players
Binghamton Whalers players
Tilburg Trappers players
Indianapolis Checkers (CHL) players
EV Füssen players